The following is the complete filmography of American actor Peter Fonda.

Film

Television

Video games

References

External links
 

American filmographies
Male actor filmographies